The 1929 Lanarkshire North by-election was a parliamentary by-election held in the United Kingdom on 21 March 1929 for the House of Commons constituency of North Lanarkshire in Scotland.

Vacancy 
The by-election was caused by the death on 8 February of the constituency's Unionist Member of Parliament, Sir Alexander Sprot, who had gained the seat from Labour at the 1924 general election.

History

Candidates 
The Unionists selected 29-year-old Mungo Murray to defend the seat. He was the son of Lord Mansfield. A graduate of the University of Oxford, he had served in the Black Watch. He was standing for parliament for the first time.
The Labour Party needed to select a new candidate as their last candidate, the former MP, Joseph Sullivan, had been elected at the 1926 Bothwell by-election. Sullivan had been a prominent figure in the Lanarkshire Miners Association and local Labour Party would have liked to choose another miners representative. However, they settled on Miss Jennie Lee, a teacher from Fife and a graduate from Edinburgh University. She was standing for parliament for the first time.

The local Liberal Association selected 49-year-old Miss Elizabeth Mitchell as their candidate. She had contested Lanark at the 1924 general election. She was the daughter of Andrew Mitchell, a former sheriff of Lanarkshire and a member of Lanarkshire Education Authority. She was educated at St. George's School for Girls, Edinburgh, Edinburgh University, and Oxford University. She taught at the Royal Holloway College, University of London. She was Hon. Secretary to the Committee on Women in Agriculture in Scotland, Convener of Continuation classes at the County of Lanark and Vice- President of the Scottish Liberal Federation.

Campaign
On 1 March, nationally, Liberal leader, David Lloyd George launched the Liberal programme for the upcoming General Election, titled We Can Conquer Unemployment.

Result

Aftermath

References

 British Parliamentary Election Results 1918-1949, compiled and edited by F.W.S. Craig (The Macmillan Press 1979)

1929 elections in the United Kingdom
1929 in Scotland
1920s elections in Scotland
Lanarkshire, North East
Lanarkshire